Hakea neurophylla, commonly known as the pink-flowered hakea, is a shrub of the genus Hakea native to a small area near Dandaragan in the Wheatbelt region of Western Australia.

Description
Racemes of fragrant blooms appear from July to August in profusion in white or pale pink-red along the branchlets in the leaf axils. Inflorescences are solitary with 12 to 18 scented flowers with glabrous pedicels.
Leaves have 3 prominent longitudinal veins on both sides ending in a blunt point.

Taxonomy and naming
Hakea neurophylla was first formally described by Carl Meisner in 1855.    Named from the Greek word neuron - nerve and phyllon leaf, a reference to the prominent veins in the leaves.

Distribution and habitat
Hakea neurophylla is a rare species restricted to the Mt Lesueur - Eneabba area north of Perth in heathland sand over laterite usually on ridge tops.

Conservation status
Hakea neurophylla is classified as Priority Four - Rare by the Western Australian Government Department of Parks and Wildlife.

References

neurophylla
Eudicots of Western Australia
Plants described in 1855